Zoétgomdé may refer to:

Zoétgomdé, Boulkiemdé, Burkina Faso
Zoétgomdé, Ganzourgou, Burkina Faso